Giuseppe Capponi (14 September 1832 – 6 August 1889) was an Italian operatic tenor who sang leading roles both in Italy and Europe. He is most remembered today as the tenor soloist in the world premiere of the Verdi Requiem.

Capponi was born in Cantiano near Pesaro and studied music there with the composer and Cantiano's maestro di cappella, Natale Pellicci. From 1857 he was the primo tenore in the choir of the Basilica della Santa Casa in Loreto, a post he held to the end of his life. He made his stage debut in 1858 at the Teatro Valle in Rome where he sang comprimario roles. His debut in a leading tenor role came in 1860, when he sang Pollione in Norma at Pesaro.  He was heard in Paris  at the Théâtre-Italien in 1863 in the relatively minor role of Barbarino in Alessandro Stradella. However, by the 1865–1866 season, he was singing major roles at the Teatro Regio in Parma, including Vasco da Gama in Meyerbeer's L'Africaine, Lamberto in the world premiere of Giovanni Rossi's Niccolò de' Lapi, and the Duke of Mantova in Rigoletto.

Notes and references

Sources

Resigno, Eduardo (2001). "Capponi, Giuseppe" Dizionario Verdiano. Biblioteca Universale Rizzoli, pp. 126–127.  
Busch, Hans (1978). Verdi's Aida: the history of an opera in letters and documents. University of Minnesota Press. 

Italian operatic tenors
1832 births
1889 deaths
People from the Province of Pesaro and Urbino
19th-century Italian male opera singers